Amorn Thammanarm (born October 16, 1983) is a Thai retired professional footballer who plays as a winger.

Honours

Clubs
Muangthong United
 Thai Premier League (1): 2010
 Kor Royal Cup (1): 2010

PT Prachuap FC
 Thai League Cup (1) : 2019

External links
 

1983 births
Living people
Amorn Thammanarm
Amorn Thammanarm
Association football wingers
Amorn Thammanarm
Amorn Thammanarm
Amorn Thammanarm
Amorn Thammanarm
Amorn Thammanarm
Amorn Thammanarm
Amorn Thammanarm
Amorn Thammanarm
Amorn Thammanarm
Amorn Thammanarm